Miss Juneteenth is a 2020 American drama film written and directed by Channing Godfrey Peoples and starring Nicole Beharie, Kendrick Sampson, and Alexis Chikaeze. The plot follows a single mom and former teen beauty queen who enters her daughter into the local Miss Juneteenth pageant. The film premiered at Sundance in January 2020, and was released via video on demand on June 19, 2020, coinciding with the 155th anniversary of the historically Black holiday which originated in the south eastern United States.

The film received critical acclaim. It received accolades from South by Southwest, the BlackStar Film Festival, and the National Board of Review. For the role, Nicole Beharie received a Gotham Award for Best Actress.

Plot 
Turquoise Jones (Nicole Beharie), is a single mother in a suburb of Fort Worth, Texas. She is the former winner of the local Miss Juneteenth pageant which offers full scholarship to a historically black college. She enters her 15-year-old daughter, Kai (Alexis Chikaeze) in the same pageant despite her daughter's obvious lack of enthusiasm.

While other former Miss Juneteenth winners have gone on to have successful careers, Turquoise's education was derailed by the birth of Kai, which forced her to drop out of college and for a time work as a stripper. To make ends meet she currently works at a bar and part time as a beautician at a mortuary where the owner is romantically interested in her. However, Turquoise is still in love with Kai's father Ronnie, and the two continue sleeping together despite officially being separated.

Kai struggles with her preparations for the Miss Juneteenth pageant, wanting to pursue dance instead. When her father fails to come through with the money for her pageant dress, she is forced to compete in her mother's old gown.

The Miss Juneteenth pageant goes forward. To Turquoise's surprise, for the talent portion Kai performs Maya Angelou's Phenomenal Woman, the poem that Turquoise performed herself and had been pushing Kai to perform, except set to dance. Turquoise is proud of Kai's performance, but nevertheless Kai fails to even place in the pageant.

After the owner of the bar where she works suffers heart problems, he lets Turquoise know that he must sell the bar. She gives him a counter-proposal, offering to slowly buy out his business. He accepts and Turquoise begins her new life as a businesswoman.

Cast 

Nicole Beharie as Turquoise Jones
Kendrick Sampson as Ronnie
 Alexis Chikaeze as Kai Jones
Liz Mikel as Betty Ray
 Marcus Mauldin as Wayman
 Jaime Matthis as Quantavious
 Lori Hayes as Charlotte
 Akron Watson as Bacon
 Phyllis Cicero as Mrs. Washington
 Lisha Hackney as Clarissa

Production 
Miss Juneteenth is director Channing Godfrey Peoples' first feature film. She was raised celebrating Juneteenth and attending Miss Juneteenth pageants.

The film marked the return of Nicole Beharie in a starring  role, who appeared in few productions after her abrupt departure from Fox series Sleepy Hollow. Beharie discussed being blacklisted after requesting accommodations for an autoimmune disease she developed during the production of the show.

The director of photography was Daniel Patterson, the production designer was Olivia Peebles, and Rachel Dainer-Best was the costume designer. Filming took place during July and August 2019 in Fort Worth, Texas.

Release 
Miss Juneteenth premiered at 2020 Sundance in the U.S. Dramatic Competition.

Vertical Entertainment acquired distribution rights to the film in April 2020 and released it digitally on the 155th anniversary of Juneteenth, June 19, 2020.

Reception

Box office 
The film made $20,946 from six theaters in its opening weekend (an average of $3,491 per venue), finishing sixth among reported films.

Critical response 
The site's critics consensus reads: "Like a pageant winner walking across the stage, Miss Juneteenth follows a familiar path – but does so with charm and grace." On Metacritic, the film has a weighted average score of 73 out of 100, based on 27 critics, indicating "generally favorable reviews".

Writing for The New York Times, Lovia Gyarkye praised the film's abundant themes: "The movie tackles multitudinous themes in its roughly 100 minutes, from the significance of Juneteenth, which commemorates the end of slavery in the United States, to the legacy of racism in predatory bank lending practices. But what’s most impressive is the amount of space Peoples’s black female characters inhabit in the narrative." Angelica Jade Bastién, writing in Vulture, further praised the film's content: "Miss Juneteenth isn't trying to make grand proclamations about what it means to be Black in America today. The film is too smart for such grandstanding. Instead, it revels in watching Black folks just be."

In a review for Variety, Dennis Harvey applauded the film's "basic authenticity that will ring true for many viewers unaccustomed to seeing themselves onscreen" but also noted that the storytelling was "rewarding if somewhat predictable", and could use editing to improve "its sometimes too-leisurely tempo a bit." David Rooney of The Hollywood Reporter wrote positively of the depiction of the mother and daughter: "Whenever Peoples returns her gaze to the intimate bond between Turquoise and Kai, with the push and pull of their relationship, its challenges and rewards, played out with exquisite understatement by Beharie and Chikaeze, this becomes a satisfying portrait of hope and resilience."

Television adaptation 
On January 11, 2021 it was announced that NBCUniversal signed a first-look deal with director Channing Godfrey Peoples, and that will include her developing a television adaptation of Miss Juneteenth.

Awards and nominations

References

External links 

2020 films
2020 independent films
American independent films
African-American drama films
African-American films
Films about competitions
Films set in Texas
Films shot in Fort Worth, Texas
Juneteenth
Vertical Entertainment films
2020 directorial debut films
2020 drama films
Films about mother–daughter relationships
Films about parenting
Films about beauty pageants
2020s English-language films
2020s American films